Ammannia fitzgeraldii is a species in the family Lythraceae that is endemic to northern Australia.

The species is found in the Kimberley region of Western Australia.

References

fitzgeraldii
Plants described in 2014
Rosids of Western Australia
Taxa named by Russell Lindsay Barrett